Heng Fa Chuen is a station on the  of the MTR in Hong Kong. The station is located in the heart of the Heng Fa Chuen housing development. The livery of the station is orange-red.
 
It is the only station on the line that is on the ground level, and among the only two stations which is not underground. It is one of three Island line stations that have opposing side platforms, as opposed to island platforms or side platforms on different levels of a station.

The MTR depot for the Island line, the Chai Wan Depot, is located to the northeast of the station. Automatic platform gates were installed in this station in April 2011. 

It remains the easternmost station on Hong Kong Island. The next station on the eastbound of the line, Chai Wan station, which is also the eastern terminus of the line, is located to its westsouthwest.

History
Before opening on 31 May 1985, names proposed for this station included North Chai Wan, Agonar or A Kung Ngam, Chai Wan Quay, and Pak Sha Wan. It was after the opening of phase one (of the Heng Fa Chuen development) that prompted the MTR to change the name to Heng Fa Chuen. This station was primarily used by construction workers in the early 1980s, during the construction of Heng Fa Chuen.

The station building is made of cast-in-situ reinforced concrete and sits on a bored pile foundation. The station opened in May 1985 as part of the first phase of the Island line.

Station layout
Both platforms 1 and 2 are located on ground level, with the rails running through the middle of the station. There is a wall with holes cut into it, separating the two tracks. Advertisements are displayed on this wall.

Shops
Circle K Mini-store
Hang Seng Bank ATMs
Maxim's Cakes
A Bank of China (Hong Kong) ATM

Entrances/exits
A1: Paradise Mall (West) 
A2: Paradise Mall (East)

See also
Hong Kong Institute of Vocational Education (Chai Wan Campus)

References

MTR stations on Hong Kong Island
Island line (MTR)
Heng Fa Chuen
Railway stations in Hong Kong opened in 1985
1985 establishments in Hong Kong